Bulimnea is a genus of gastropods belonging to the family Lymnaeidae.

The species of this genus are found in Northern America.

Species:

Bulimnea megasoma 
Bulimnea petaluma 
Bulimnea webbi

References

Lymnaeidae